Hornbrook is a surname. Notable people with the surname include:

Alfred Hornbrook, New Zealand settler  at Mount Pleasant in 1849
Bruce Hornbrook Sage (1909–1983), American chemical engineer and lecturer
Chris Hornbrook, American musician, founding member of metalcore band Poison the Well
Hester Hornbrook, co-founder of the Melbourne City Mission in 185
James Joseph Hornbrook (1868–1942), American brigadier general during World War I
Olive MacFarland (née Hornbrook; 1872–1962), American artist and illustrator
Rebecca Hornbrook (born 1975), Canadian atmospheric chemist
 Thomas Hornbrook, whose name was the source of the former name of Wheeling Park, a park in Wheeling, West Virginia, U.S.
Thomas Lyde Hornbrook (1807–1855), British marine artist

Fictional characters
Cathi Hornbrook, in A Dream of Kings (novel), American novel published in 1955

See also
Hornbrook, California, a place in the United States
Hornbrook Formation, a geological formation in California, U.S.
Hornbrook's Park, now Wheeling Park
Hornibrook, a surname